The 2018 Red Rock Pro Open was a professional tennis tournament played on outdoor hard courts. It was the tenth edition of the tournament and was part of the 2018 ITF Women's Circuit. It took place in Las Vegas, United States, on 5–11 November 2018.

Singles main draw entrants

Seeds 

 1 Rankings as of 29 October 2018.

Other entrants 
The following players received a wildcard into the singles main draw:
  Louisa Chirico
  Kayla Day
  Maria Mateas

The following player received entry using a protected ranking:
  Elizabeth Halbauer
  Nadia Podoroska

The following players received entry from the qualifying draw:
  Hanna Chang
  Jennifer Elie
  Giuliana Olmos
  Maria Sanchez

Champions

Singles

 Belinda Bencic def.  Nicole Gibbs, 7–5, 6–1

Doubles

 Asia Muhammad /  Maria Sanchez def.  Sophie Chang /  Alexandra Mueller, 6–3, 6–4

External links 
 2018 Red Rock Pro Open at ITFtennis.com
 Official website

2018 ITF Women's Circuit
2018 in American sports
 
2018